The 2015–16 UEFA Champions League was the 61st season of Europe's premier club football tournament organised by UEFA, and the 24th season since it was renamed from the European Champion Clubs' Cup to the UEFA Champions League. Barcelona were the title holders, but were eliminated by Atlético Madrid in the quarter-finals.

The final was played between Real Madrid and Atlético Madrid at the San Siro in Milan, Italy, with Madrid defeating Atlético 5–3 on penalties (1–1 after extra time) to win a record-extending eleventh European Cup/Champions League title. It was the second time in the tournament's history that both finalists were from the same city, after the same clubs faced each other in the 2014 final.

As the winners of the 2015–16 UEFA Champions League, Real Madrid qualified as the UEFA representative for the 2016 FIFA Club World Cup in Japan (their third Club World Cup appearance), and also earned the right to play against the winners of the 2015–16 UEFA Europa League, Sevilla, in the 2016 UEFA Super Cup. Madrid won both competitions.

Format changes
The UEFA Executive Committee held in May 2013 approved the following changes to the UEFA Champions League starting from the 2015–16 season (for the three-year cycle until the 2017–18 season):
The winners of the previous season's UEFA Europa League will qualify for the UEFA Champions League. They will enter at least the play-off round, and will enter the group stage if the berth reserved for the Champions League title holders is not used.
The previous limit of a maximum of four teams per association will be increased to five, meaning that if the Champions League title holders or the Europa League title holders are from the top three ranked associations (but not both from the same one) and finish outside the top four of their domestic league, the fourth-placed team of their association will not be prevented from participating in the tournament. However, if both the Champions League title holders and the Europa League title holders are from the same top three ranked association and finish outside the top four of their domestic league, the fourth-placed team of their association will be moved to the Europa League.

Association team allocation
A total of 78 teams from 53 of the 54 UEFA member associations participated in the 2015–16 UEFA Champions League (the exception being Liechtenstein, which does not organise a domestic league). The association ranking based on the UEFA country coefficients was used to determine the number of participating teams for each association:
Associations 1–3 each have four teams qualify.
Associations 4–6 each have three teams qualify.
Associations 7–15 each have two teams qualify.
Associations 16–54 (except Liechtenstein) each have one team qualify.
The winners of the 2014–15 UEFA Champions League and 2014–15 UEFA Europa League were each given an additional entry if they would not qualify for the 2015–16 UEFA Champions League through their domestic league. Because a maximum of five teams from one association can enter the UEFA Champions League, if both the Champions League title holders and the Europa League title holders were from the same top three ranked association and finished outside the top four of their domestic league, the fourth-placed team of their association would be moved to the Europa League. For this season:
The winners of the 2014–15 UEFA Champions League, Barcelona, qualified through their domestic league, meaning the additional entry for the Champions League title holders was not necessary.
The winners of the 2014–15 UEFA Europa League, Sevilla, did not qualify through their domestic league, meaning the additional entry for the Europa League title holders was necessary.

Association ranking
For the 2015–16 UEFA Champions League, the associations are allocated places according to their 2014 UEFA country coefficients, which takes into account their performance in European competitions from 2009–10 to 2013–14.

Apart from the allocation based on the country coefficients, associations may have additional teams participating in the Champions League, as noted below:
 – Additional berth for Europa League title holders

Distribution
In the default access list, the Champions League title holders enter the group stage. However, since Barcelona already qualified for the group stage (as the champions of the 2014–15 La Liga), the Champions League title holders berth in the group stage is given to the Europa League title holders, Sevilla.

Teams
League positions of the previous season qualified via league position shown in parentheses. Sevilla qualified as Europa League title holders. (TH: Champions League title holders; EL: Europa League title holders).

Round and draw dates
The schedule of the competition is as follows (all draws are held at UEFA headquarters in Nyon, Switzerland, unless stated otherwise).

Qualifying rounds

In the qualifying rounds and the play-off round, teams were divided into seeded and unseeded teams based on their 2015 UEFA club coefficients, and then drawn into two-legged home-and-away ties. Teams from the same association could not be drawn against each other.

First qualifying round
The draw for the first and second qualifying rounds was held on 22 June 2015. The first legs were played on 30 June and 1 July, and the second legs were played on 7 July 2015.

Lincoln Red Imps became the first Gibraltar team to win a tie in a UEFA competition, two years after Gibraltar's teams were first admitted entry.

Second qualifying round
The first legs were played on 14 and 15 July, and the second legs were played on 21 and 22 July 2015.

Third qualifying round
The third qualifying round was split into two separate sections: Champions Route (for league champions) and League Route (for league non-champions). The losing teams in both sections entered the 2015–16 UEFA Europa League play-off round.

The draw for the third qualifying round was held on 17 July 2015. The first legs were played on 28 and 29 July, and the second legs were played on 4 and 5 August 2015.

Play-off round

The play-off round was split into two separate sections: Champions Route (for league champions) and League Route (for league non-champions). The losing teams in both sections entered the 2015–16 UEFA Europa League group stage.

The draw for the play-off round was held on 7 August 2015. The first legs were played on 18 and 19 August, and the second legs were played on 25 and 26 August 2015.

Group stage

The draw for the group stage was held in Monaco on 27 August 2015. The 32 teams were drawn into eight groups of four, with the restriction that teams from the same association could not be drawn against each other. For the draw, the teams were seeded into four pots based on the following principles (introduced starting this season):
Pot 1 contained the title holders and the champions of the top seven associations based on their 2014 UEFA country coefficients. As the title holders (Barcelona) were one of the champions of the top seven associations, the champions of the association ranked eighth (Netherlands' PSV Eindhoven) were also seeded into Pot 1 (regulations Article 13.05).
Pot 2, 3 and 4 contained the remaining teams, seeded based on their 2015 UEFA club coefficients.

In each group, teams played against each other home-and-away in a round-robin format. The group winners and runners-up advanced to the round of 16, while the third-placed teams entered the 2015–16 UEFA Europa League round of 32. The matchdays were 15–16 September, 29–30 September, 20–21 October, 3–4 November, 24–25 November, and 8–9 December 2015.

The youth teams of the clubs that qualified for the group stage also played in the 2015–16 UEFA Youth League on the same matchdays, where they competed in the UEFA Champions League Path (with the UEFA Youth League expanded to 64 teams, the youth domestic champions of the top 32 associations compete in a separate Domestic Champions Path until the play-offs).

A total of 17 national associations were represented in the group stage. Astana, Borussia Mönchengladbach and KAA Gent made their debut appearances in the group stage. Astana were the first team from Kazakhstan to play in the Champions League group stage. With the maximum teams from the same association in the group stage increased from four to five, Spain became the first association to have five teams in the Champions League group stage. Since all three qualifying teams from the highest ranked leagues won their ties in the league route playoff round, the three countries of Spain, England and Germany had 13 of the 32 clubs in the group stage.

Group A

Group B

Group C

Group D

Group E

Group F

Group G

Group H

Knockout phase

In the knockout phase, teams played against each other over two legs on a home-and-away basis, except for the one-match final. The mechanism of the draws for each round was as follows:
In the draw for the round of 16, the eight group winners were seeded, and the eight group runners-up were unseeded. The seeded teams were drawn against the unseeded teams, with the seeded teams hosting the second leg. Teams from the same group or the same association could not be drawn against each other.
In the draws for the quarter-finals onwards, there were no seedings, and teams from the same group or the same association could be drawn against each other.

Bracket

Round of 16
The draw for the round of 16 was held on 14 December 2015. The first legs were played on 16, 17, 23 and 24 February, and the second legs were played on 8, 9, 15 and 16 March 2016.

Quarter-finals
The draw for the quarter-finals was held on 18 March 2016. The first legs were played on 5 and 6 April, and the second legs were played on 12 and 13 April 2016.

Semi-finals
The draw for the semi-finals was held on 15 April 2016. The first legs were played on 26 and 27 April, and the second legs were played on 3 and 4 May 2016.

Final

The final was played on 28 May 2016 at the San Siro in Milan, Italy. The "home" team (for administrative purposes) was determined by an additional draw held after the semi-final draw.

Statistics
Statistics exclude qualifying rounds and play-off round.

Top goalscorers

Top assists

Squad of the Season
The UEFA Technical Study Group selected the following 18 players as the squad of the tournament.

See also

2015–16 UEFA Europa League
2015–16 UEFA Youth League
2016 UEFA Super Cup
2016 FIFA Club World Cup
2015–16 UEFA Women's Champions League

References

External links

2015–16 UEFA Champions League

 
1
2015–16